The 1985–86 season was the 89th season of competitive football in Scotland.

At a national level, Scotland's qualification for the 1986 World Cup finals in Mexico was marred by the death of Manager Jock Stein. In the end caretaker manager Alex Ferguson was not able to take the team beyond the first round.

In club football, with Rangers once again failing to mount a title challenge, manager Jock Wallace's second spell as manager ended in April when he was sacked and the club appointed Graeme Souness as player-manager, recruiting the former Liverpool midfielder from Sampdoria in Italy. Celtic eventually won the league on the final day after Hearts threw away a two-point lead.

Impressively, Aberdeen won both the Scottish Cup and the League Cup.

Scottish Premier Division

Celtic won the League and became champions in one of the closest finishes in League history. On the final day of the season Hearts were leading Celtic by two points - a draw against Dundee would have been sufficient to see them win their first League title since the 1959–60 season. Hearts lost 2–0 to Dundee at Dens Park thanks to two late goals by substitute Albert Kidd, while Celtic beat St Mirren 5–0 at Love Street. As a result, Celtic won the league on goal difference.

Relegation was suspended due to league reconstruction, therefore Motherwell and Clydebank retained their Premier Division status.

A dispute between television companies and the Scottish Football League resulted in no televised Scottish league football between September 1985 and March 1986.

Champions: Celtic
No relegation

Scottish League Division One

Promoted: Hamilton Academical, Falkirk 
Relegated: Ayr United, Alloa Athletic.

Scottish League Division Two

Promoted: Dunfermline Athletic, Queen of the South

Other honours

Cup honours

Individual honours

Scotland national team

Key:
(H) = Home match
(A) = Away match
WCQG7 = World Cup qualifying - Group 7
WCQPO = World Cup qualifying play-off match
WCGE = World Cup - Group E

Death of Jock Stein
On 10 September 1985, the Scotland team travelled to Ninian Park, Cardiff, to take on Wales in their final qualifying game for the World Cup in Mexico. They needed at least a draw to secure a place in the qualification play-off, which they finally achieved in the 81st minute when a Davie Cooper penalty drew Scotland level with Wales, who had gone ahead earlier with a Mark Hughes goal. Just after the final whistle, Scotland manager Jock Stein collapsed from a heart attack at the side of the pitch and died in the medical room shortly afterwards. He was 62 years old.

Aberdeen manager Alex Ferguson, who had been Stein's assistant, was appointed caretaker manager of Scotland after Stein's death. His first match was at Hampden Park on 20 November 1985, as Scotland took on Australia in the World Cup qualification playoff first leg. Goals from Davie Cooper and the debutant Frank McAvennie gave Scotland a 2-0 advantage, and they confirmed their place in Mexico by drawing the second leg 0–0 in Melbourne. Scotland's World Cup campaign began on 4 June, when they took on Denmark in their opening group game, only to lose 1–0. Four days later, they took on West Germany and despite taking an early lead through Gordon Strachan, lost 2-1 and were left with virtually no hope of reaching the knockout stages. Any hope of progression ended five days later when they could only manage a goalless draw against Uruguay.

Kenny Dalglish 100th cap
Three weeks after his 35th birthday, Kenny Dalglish became the Scotland team's first player to be capped 100 times as senior level in a friendly against Romania on 26 March 1986.

See also
1985–86 Aberdeen F.C. season
1985–86 Dundee United F.C. season

Notes and references

 
Seasons in Scottish football